South African number plates are unique in each of the provinces. Each province has their own number plate design, colour scheme and alphanumeric scheme. e.g. AB 12 CD GP or  CA 123-456

History 
From 1 February 2000, a process started to replace all number plates in South Africa to an aluminium number plate with an RFID tag containing a unique identification code, including the ability to identify the number plate in a foreign nation. This is termed an Intelligent Number Plate system. The system has been implemented for additional and circumstantial use. The numbering structure on plates will also then change. Concerning the foreign identification system within South Africa, foreigners are granted the permission to verify their number plate to the South African number plate system.

The Department of Transport in South Africa has set aside R25 million for the project during the 2015/2016 fiscal year. The Department of Transport in KwaZulu-Natal has set aside R1.5 million for vehicle registration plates for the province. A secure electronic mark will be used in the encryption of the code. The system can automatically generate the details of driving offences committed by a driver.

As of January 2022, new vehicles are, however, still being fitted with plastic plates and the system has still not been implemented.

New legislation also requires that a new vehicle's number plate be fixed to the body of the vehicle, or an approved number plate holder, with four 4 mm rivets.

Development

Material 
Number plates are available in plastic or metal. Plastic is the preferred material used by the majority of the motorists. They are also more common than their metal counterpart and are issued as standard plates by car dealerships, except in Gauteng Province where, from 2013, newly issued plates must be metal.

Shape 
The most common size is identical to the European number plates' size . However, a shorter plate is also common. Most car dealerships now issue the former. Other shapes such as American and motorbike sizes are also available. Number plates can be made over the counter at registration/licensing stores in shopping centres, although the vehicle registration document may be required.

Costs 
The standard annual non-personalised licence fee is between R250 and R600, depending on the province in which the vehicle is registered and the weight of the vehicle. A large number of heavy vehicles are registered in Northern and Eastern Cape where the licence fees per vehicle mass are low. The Western Cape has the most expensive annual licence fees, but as with Northern and Eastern Cape, it has few toll roads.

Vehicle owners can buy specific personalised registration numbers from registering authorities. The cost for a single digit registration e.g. CA 1 will be in the region of R6000 while a long number e.g. CA 12345 can be as low as R600.

Provinces

Overview 

In the Eastern Cape, provincial government vehicles (especially Health Department) have red letters and a red frame on white.
Limpopo was initially named Northern Province and used the code N. When the name changed, a new sequence of numbers began, ending in L.

Key:

UPPER CASE LETTERS: Literal letters in the number plate
a: compulsory letter (A – Z)
b: letter (A – Z) or nothing
x: compulsory character (A – Z, 0 – 9)
z: character (A – Z, 0 – 9) or nothing
#: an integer number (1 – 999,999)
+: a compulsory digit (0 – 9)
NB: Vowels are not used on private vehicles.
After 1994, the Western Cape Province and KwaZulu-Natal Province are the only two provinces where the registration can be still linked to specific towns and cities.  i.e. the pre-1980 system has largely been retained in these areas, so the first two or three letters at the start of each number plate identify where the vehicle was licensed.

Northern Cape 

In 1994, the Cape Province was subdivided into three provinces (Western, Eastern and Northern Cape provinces).
The Eastern and Northern Cape changed their licensing system so the Cape Province registration prefixes used there, like CB (Port Elizabeth) and CC (Kimberley), were dropped. The homeland states of Ciskei and Transkei became part of the Eastern Cape. The Stellaland district (Vryburg) became part of North West Province. The current Western Cape Province list is essentially an abbreviation of the pre-1980 Cape Province list.

KwaZulu-Natal

Free State 
The Free State is the only province in South Africa that places an expiry date on its registration plate.  Every five years the owner is required to replace the plate irrespective of condition. This is only enforced in the Free State and if the owner uses the vehicle with "expired" plates in any other province he/she will not be prosecuted. This expiry is independent from the annual licence renewal required by national law.
This is the only province in the country that has the same borders today as it did before the Boer War, although it has had three changes of name. It was the Orange Free State (a Boer republic), the Orange River Colony (1902-1910), the Orange Free State Province (Provinsie Oranje Vrystaat, 1910–1994) and is now simply the Free State.

North West 
A new numbering system was announced in December 2015, which would be implemented in February 2016.

Legal requirements 

All vehicles in South Africa, excluding motorcycles, are required to display a number plate on the front and the rear of the vehicle. For vehicles that cannot accommodate a full size plate in front, a plate with smaller dimensions may be fitted with permission from the registering authority.

The validation of a vehicle's registration number is indicated by a licence disc displayed inside the vehicle's windshield and must be visible from the passenger side of the vehicle. The vehicle's registration number, VIN and engine number as well as the licence expiry date, vehicle weight and number of passengers the vehicle is allowed to carry is indicated on the disc.

In the Western Cape and KwaZulu-Natal, where the registration number is indicative of the town of registration, the registration number will not change when the owner of the vehicle relocates to another town in the same province. It is required of the owner to inform the authorities of a change of address within 21 days. However, if the owner relocates to another province, the owner has to register the vehicle in that province within 21 days. Whenever a vehicle is registered in a new owner's name, the vehicle will receive the registration of the new owner's town. If the vehicle is registered in the same town as the current registration, no change of registration number takes place.

When a vehicle changes ownership it is required that the vehicle be taken for a roadworthy test. The new owner is allowed to use a vehicle for a period of 21 days on the previous owner's registration before the vehicle has to be registered in the new owner's name. If the roadworthy result cannot be obtained within this period, the owner may register the vehicle without being roadworthy, however a licence disc will not be issued and the vehicle may not be used on a public road. A temporary permit must be obtained from the registering authority to drive the vehicle to the testing station or repair shop. The permit is valid for three days.

When a person buys a vehicle from a dealer in another province or town other than the one they live in, a temporary permit valid for three weeks is issued by the registration authorities. A vehicle can only be registered in the town the owner lives in. It is also not possible to renew the licence in any other town than the town the registered owner lives in.

The temporary permit is a cardboard "number plate" to be displayed in either the front or rear window of the vehicle.

When a vehicle's engine is replaced or the VIN and engine number needs to be verified for some legal reason, the vehicle needs to obtain police clearance. Since September 2012, a vehicle can only obtain a clearance if it was marked with a micro dot, or data dot system. This is a process where about 10,000 micro dots with a serial number on is sprayed with a resin onto all components of the vehicle. This serial number is linked to the vehicle's VIN on the national registration database. These dots can be found with an ultraviolet light and when magnified the serial number can be traced. New vehicles are treated in the factory and the dots carry the vehicle's VIN. This is to assist the authorities in identifying a vehicle or any part thereof when VIN and engine numbers are not legible, or have been removed.

Legislation is also on the table to have micro dotting made compulsory for all vehicles changing owners as well as requiring a 2-yearly roadworthy status for vehicles older than 10 years. The downside of this is that it might cause many poorer South Africans not to register vehicles in their name or to let licences lapse and just pay the fine when getting caught.

It is illegal in South Africa to alter or tamper with a vehicle's VIN or the factory stamped number on an engine in any way. Evidence of tampering will lead to the vehicles being confiscated and possibly destroyed.

Historical Plates 

Before 1994, South Africa had only four provinces: Cape Province, Natal Province, Orange Free State and Transvaal. Each province had its own identifying lettering: Cape – C, Natal – N, Orange Free State – O and Transvaal – T.

References

External links
 
 License plates of South Africa – Picture gallery at Francoplaque
 License plates of South Africa – Updated information and examples

South Africa
Number plate
Road transport in South Africa
 Registration plates